Bankers Life is the primary subsidiary of CNO Financial Group, Inc. (itself formerly Conseco, Inc until 2010). The company was established in 1879 in Chicago, Illinois. CNO is a Fortune 1000 company (rank of 548 in 2015) whose subsidiaries provide insurance products and services to customers in the United States.  The core retail market served by Bankers Life is the pre-retirement and retirement aged individual and their families whose annual household income is between $25,000 and $75,000.

Bankers Life has 1.4 million policyholders and offers a variety of different insurance products including long-term care and life insurance, annuities, Medicare products including supplement plans, Medicare Advantage plans and Medicare Part D prescription drug coverage and critical illness/specified disease insurance. Bankers Life also offers vision and dental plans through a partnership with Humana. They sell their policies through a network of over 5,000 insurance agents based in over 320 offices throughout the USA.

History 
Bankers Life's predecessor, the Hotel Men's Mutual Benefit Association, began operations on January 17, 1879. 

In 1935, John D. MacArthur bought Bankers Life, and continued to develop it until his death in 1978. After studying how large American manufacturers branded and mass-marketed household goods and services, MacArthur led Bankers Life in reducing the cost of selling insurance and in making insurance coverage more affordable for middle-income Americans.  

By 1956, Bankers Life was one of the largest individual health and accident insurance companies in the U.S.  The needs of America's growing senior market became Bankers Life's focus once President Johnson signed the Medicare bill into law.  Bankers Life became one of the first insurers to develop and offer Medicare supplement insurance. Upon MacArthur's death, control of the company passed to the John D. and Catherine T. MacArthur Foundation, a major charitable institution in the U.S.  The foundation later sold Bankers Life, and today, the company is a subsidiary of CNO Financial Group, a holding company for a group of insurance companies operating throughout the United States. As of 2015, Bankers Life has $19 billion in assets under management. In 2012, Bankers Life processed more than 8.5 million claims and paid out more than $1.3 billion in policy benefits.

Products and services

Medicare Supplement insurance
Bankers Life offers Medicare Medicare Supplement insurance plans A, B, D, F, with high deductible, G, K, L, M, and N. These types of supplements help pay for items that Medicare may not cover such as Medicare deductibles, hospital and medical care co-insurance, extended hospital care, physician's services, hospital outpatient services and supplies, and ambulance services.

Life insurance
Bankers Life offers term life insurance, whole life insurance and universal life insurance. These products differ in terms of coverage length, premium flexibility, cash value accumulation and distribution.

Annuities
Bankers Life offers a variety of annuities, including Fixed Interest Annuity, Fixed Index Annuity, and Immediate Annuity.

Long term care insurance
Bankers Life offers several types of extended care coverage that include comprehensive long-term care insurance, Facility-only long-term care insurance, home health care insurance, and short-term care insurance.

Supplemental health insurance
Bankers Life offers a variety of supplemental health insurance coverage options such as critical illness insurance which covers cancer, heart attack, stroke, end-stage kidney failure, and other conditions.

Research Studies
U.S. News & World Report referenced a recent study conducted by Bankers Life in an article titled "A Dozen Big Changes in Perceptions About Retirement". The Bankers Life study, titled "Middle-Income Boomers, Financial Security and the New Retirement," found that nearly 3 of every 4 middle-income Baby Boomers are rethinking their retirement date, and of these, 79% are delaying their retirement by an average of five years.

Charity funding

Alzheimer's Association 
Bankers Life is a national sponsor of the Alzheimer's Association, which is the world's leading voluntary health organization in Alzheimer's care, support and research.
 Since 2003, the company has organized Forget Me Not Days, it is an annual nationwide fundraising campaign to collect donations for the Alzheimer's Association and raise public awareness of the disease. These campaigns have supported the Association with more than $2.9 million for care, education and research programs.
 In 2011, Bankers Life contributed $386,000 and in 2012 they contributed $420,000 to support the care, support and research efforts to the Alzheimer's Association through a fundraiser and a separate corporate donation.  
 In 2014, Bankers Life collected and donated over $436,000 on behalf of the Alzheimer's Association.
 Bankers Life opened its annual 2015 Forget Me Not Days with Alzheimer's Awareness Night at Bankers Life Fieldhouse, in Indianapolis, Indiana on April 12, 2015.

Meals on Wheels Chicago 
Bankers Life also supports Meals on Wheels Chicago. In 2010, the company made a $20,000 donation to aid Meals on Wheels Chicago.  Since 2004, Bankers has donated $230,000 to Meals on Wheels Chicago for programs, services and fundraising initiatives.

Bankers Life Fieldhouse
On December 22, 2011, CNO Financial Group, Inc. and Indiana Pacers Sports & Entertainment announced that Conseco Fieldhouse would be renamed the Bankers Life Fieldhouse. This is home to both the NBA Indiana Pacers and the WNBA Indiana Fever. The venue hosts nearly two million guests a year and features events, such as the 2015 U.S. National Gymnastics Championships.

In March 2018, the company announced that its parent company, CNO Financial Group would not extend its naming partnership with Pacers Sports and Entertainment.  In a news release, the company's chief executive officer said the partnership would continue, but in a more limited capacity.

References

External links
Bankers Life Insurance — Official Site
The Bankers Story — History

Financial services companies established in 1879
American companies established in 1879
Insurance companies of the United States
Companies based in Chicago
Insurance companies based in Illinois
1879 establishments in Illinois